Mukhmel Pur is a census town in North West district in the Indian territory of Delhi. As per the Population Census 2011, there are total 910 families residing in the Mukhmel Pur city. The total population of Mukhmel Pur is 4,931 out of which 2,649 are males and 2,282 are females thus the Average Sex Ratio of Mukhmel Pur is 861.

The population of Children of age 0–6 years in Mukhmel Pur city is 584 which is 12% of the total population. There are 331 male children and 253 female children between the age 0–6 years. Thus as per the Census 2011 the Child Sex Ratio of Mukhmel Pur is 764 which is less than Average Sex Ratio (861).

As per the Census 2011, the literacy rate of Mukhmel Pur is 84.8%. Thus Mukhmel Pur has higher literacy rate compared to 84.4% of North West district. The male literacy rate is 91.76% and the female literacy rate is 76.74% in Mukhmel Pur.

References

Cities and towns in North West Delhi district